Cerea is a town and comune in the province of Verona, Veneto, northern Italy.

History
From 923 AD until 1223 Cerea was a castrum (fortification). On 1223 Cerea it became a "comune" but, a year after, it was plundered because of the war between Mantua and Verona. A period of decadence followed, also because of the frequent epidemics. In the 18th century, under the Venetian rule, Cerea began to grow and the noblemen started building their villas.

Classic furniture in Cerea has a long and rich history. Cerea started manufacturing art furniture during the Twenties in the Asparetto suburb. Here, a "marangon" (artisan), Giuseppe Merlin, was hired by Ing. Bresciani to restore an ancient piece of furniture from the 600 century.  He then moved on to reproduce furniture from older ages faithfully.  He and other artisans expanded and now  Cerea has more than 500 furniture factories, 95% of which are still handcraft shops.

Sports
 A.S.D. Cerea 1912 football club

Sources 
Official website
Natural area in Cerea

Cities and towns in Veneto